"Mr. Lonely" is a song by Canadian singer Deborah Cox. It was written by Ahmad Russell, Christopher Jennings, Eric Johnson, Eric Jones, Takia Jennings, and Terry Johnson for her third studio album The Morning After (2002), with production helmed by Jennings and Johnson along with William Lockwood. The song, along with several remix versions, was released as the album's second single in fall 2002 and reached number one the US Billboard Dance Club Songs.

Track listings

Notes
 denotes additional producer
 denotes co-producer

Credits and personnel
Credits lifted from the liner notes of The Morning After.

Deborah Cox – background vocalist, lead vocalist
Christopher Jennings – producer, writer
Takia Jennings – writer
Eric Johnson – producer, writer
Terry Johnson – writer

Eric Jones – writer
William Lockwood – producer
J. Mai – background vocalist
Tiffany Palmer – background vocalist
Ahmad Russell – writer

Charts

References

2002 songs
2002 singles
Deborah Cox songs
J Records singles